The WS-13, codename Taishan, is a turbofan engine designed and manufactured by Guizhou Aircraft Industry Corporation to power the CAC/PAC JF-17 Thunder lightweight multirole fighter jointly developed by China and Pakistan, and in the near future the Shenyang FC-31 fifth-generation stealth fighter currently under development.

Design and development
China began development of the Taishan in 2000 to replace the Klimov RD-93 turbofan, which had been selected in the 1990s to power the JF-17 lightweight fighter. It is designed to have a life span of 2,200 hours and an improved version, providing around 100 kN (22,450 lb) of thrust with afterburner, is under development.

The WS-13 Taishan was certified in 2007 and serial production began in 2009. The 18 March 2010 edition of the HKB Report stated that a JF-17 equipped with the WS-13 completed its first successful runway taxi test.

Officials at the Farnborough International Airshow in August 2010 stated that a JF-17 was being test flown with a Chinese engine, likely the WS-13. In November 2012, Aviation Week & Space Technology reported that flight testing on the JF-17 was underway in China. It was reported at the 2015 Paris Air Show that testing was continuing.

Variants
 WS-13 –  thrust with afterburner
 WS-13A – high bypass
 WS-13E –  thrust with afterburner

Specifications (WS-13)

See also

References

External links
 WS13 / RD-33 / RD-93 at GlobalSecurity.org

2000s turbofan engines
Low-bypass turbofan engines